Edward Augustine "Fred" Knouff (June 1867 – September 14, 1900) was an American Major League Baseball pitcher from 1885 to 1889. He played for the Philadelphia Athletics, Baltimore Orioles, St. Louis Browns, and Cleveland Blues.

Biography
Knouff started his professional baseball career in 1884, at the age of seventeen, with Newark of the Eastern League. He played in various leagues until 1892.

In 1897, Knouff was serving as a Philadelphia firefighter when he fell and broke his back. Doctors were unable to help him, and Knouff remained in a hospital until his death in 1900.

References

External links

1867 births
1900 deaths
19th-century baseball players
Major League Baseball pitchers
Philadelphia Athletics (AA) players
Baltimore Orioles (AA) players
St. Louis Browns (AA) players
Cleveland Blues (1887–88) players
Minor league baseball managers
Newark Domestics players
Macon (minor league baseball) players
Syracuse Stars (minor league baseball) players
Memphis Grays players
Milwaukee Brewers (minor league) players
Milwaukee Creams players
Lebanon (minor league baseball) players
Wilmington Blue Hens players
Cedar Rapids Canaries players
Memphis Giants players
Lebanon Pretzel Eaters players
Baseball players from Philadelphia